English place names in Barbados is a list of Barbadian place names that were originally place names in England later applied in Barbados by English emigrants and explorers. Barbados has been known for centuries as being the island in the West Indies that appears the most British.

Christ Church
Hastings
Vauxhall
Worthing
Scarborough

St. Michael
Brighton

St. John
Bath

Saint Peter
Speightstown, Alias Little Bristol

Saint James
Folkestone
Holetown (originally named Jamestown)

References

See also
List of cities, towns and villages in Barbados

Geography of Barbados
Barbados
English name